Marino Basso (born 1 June 1945) is an Italian former professional road racing cyclist, considered one of the best sprinters of his generation. He won the World Cycling Championship in 1972.

Basso was born at Rettorgole di Caldogno, in the Veneto. He was one of the main sprinters of the 1970s, often duelling with Belgians Patrick Sercu, Guido Reybroeck and Roger de Vlaeminck, and fellow Italian Dino Zandegù.

Basso won a total of 15 stages at the Giro d'Italia, 6 at the Tour de France and 6 at the Vuelta a España. He was Giro d'Italia's points classification winner in 1971 and the Italian national champion in 1972.

He is not related to Italian cyclist Ivan Basso, but his brother Alcide founded Basso Bikes.

After his professional career, Basso became a manager at a number of teams including Preti Mangimi.

Major results

1967
GP Campagnolo
Tour de France:
Winner stages 3 and 18
1968
CP Cemab
Milano–Vignola
Chieti
Paris–Luxembourg (with Michele Dancelli)
1969
Col San Martino
Giro del Piemonte
Tre Valli Varesine
Trofeo Matteotti
Giro de Campania
Chieto
Tour de France:
Winner stage 1A
Giro d'Italia:
Winner stages 8, 13, 18A and 18B
1970
Cittadella
Tour de France:
Winner stages 3B, 11B and 21
1971
Giro d'Italia:
Winner stage 1
 Winner points classification
Milano–Vignola
1972
Coppa Bernocchi
  UCI World Road Race Championships
Cittadella
1973
Grand Prix of Aargau Canton
Milano–Vignola
Pasajes
Genoa–Nice
1974
Castelfranco Veneto
Six days of Castelgomberto (with Dieter Kemper)
Sarnico
GP Montelupo
1975
Vuelta a España:
Winner stages 4, 6, 8, 9, 10 and 11B
1976
Col San Martino
1977
Coppa Placci
Castelfranco Veneto
1978
Zambana

External links 

Official Tour de France results for Marino Basso

1945 births
Living people
Cyclists from the Province of Vicenza
Italian male cyclists
Italian Tour de France stage winners
UCI Road World Champions (elite men)
Italian Giro d'Italia stage winners
Italian Vuelta a España stage winners